Long Meadow, also known as the Cyrus Rhodes House, is a historic home located near Harrisonburg, Rockingham County, Virginia. It was built about 1845, and is a two-story, three-bay, double-pile brick dwelling in the Greek Revival style.  It sits on an English basement, has a low-pitched standing seam metal hipped roof, and central-passage plan.  Also on the property are the contributing frame bank barn (c. 1866) and family cemetery.

It was listed on the National Register of Historic Places in 2005.

References

Houses on the National Register of Historic Places in Virginia
Greek Revival houses in Virginia
Houses completed in 1845
Houses in Rockingham County, Virginia
National Register of Historic Places in Rockingham County, Virginia